A.C.T is a Swedish progressive rock band formed in 1995 under the name ‘Fairyland’, in Malmö. The band has been through several personnel changes; with the current line-up featuring Herman Saming (vocals), Ola Andersson (guitar), Jerry Sahlin (keyboards), Peter Asp (bass) and Thomas Lejon (drums).

History
Initially under Ola Andersson on guitars, Tomas Erlandsson on drums, Jens Appelgren on vocals and Jerry Sahlin on keyboards, Fairyland was started by members of a music school in Malmö. Amongst various line-up changes, Fairyland changed its name into A.C.T in 1995. In 1996 A.C.T first came into the public eye when it made its way to the final of a Swedish music competition, although it did not win.

In 1997 a new demo was recorded and the band toured extensively in Sweden, eventually recording its debut album, Today’s Report, released in 1999. Following the release of this album, A.C.T embarked on a Scandinavian tour with the progressive rock band Saga.

In 2001, the second album Imaginary Friends was recorded and the band went on a European tour supporting Fish.

In 2003, A.C.T's third album Last Epic was released, and the band went on a European tour with former Genesis singer Ray Wilson.

In 2006, A.C.T signed with the label InsideOut and returned with the album Silence. InsideOut has subsequently re-released the first three albums as special editions, with bonus tracks and enhanced booklets.

On December 24, 2013 the band announced, on their Facebook page, that their fifth album Circus Pandemonium will be released on February 19, 2014 in Japan, and on March 5, 2014 in Europe/USA and on iTunes.

Discography

Studio albums
 Today's Report (1999)
 Imaginary Friends (2001)
 Last Epic (2003)
 Silence (2006)
 Circus Pandemonium (2014)

Demos
 Early Recordings (1996)

EPs
 Rebirth (2019)
 Heatwave (2021)
 Falling (2023)

Live albums
 Trifles and Pandemonium (2016)

Personnel

Current lineup
 Herman Saming – lead vocals
 Ola Andersson – lead guitar, vocals
 Jerry Sahlin – keyboards, vocals
 Peter Asp – bass guitar, synthesizer, percussion
 Thomas Lejon – drums, percussion

Former members
 Jens Appelgren – vocals
 Simon Nicklasson - bass
 Tomas Erlandsson - drums

References

External links
 A.C.T at MySpace
 A.C.T biography by Gary Hill, discography and album reviews, credits & releases at AllMusic
 A.C.T discography, album releases & credits at Discogs.com
 A.C.T biography, discography, album credits & user reviews at ProgArchives.com
 A.C.T albums to be listened as stream at Spotify.com
 A.C.T at Avalon Label (in Japanese)
 Interview with Jerry Sahlin at www.RockLine.it 

Swedish progressive rock groups
Musical groups established in 1995
Inside Out Music artists